Ripart's anomalous blue (Polyommatus ripartii) is a butterfly in the family Lycaenidae.

It is found in Southern Europe, Greece and the Balkans, Asia Minor and the Crimea, South-West Siberia, the Altai Mountains and Kazakhstan. 
It now includes the former Agrodiaetus galloi (Italy), Agrodiaetus exuberans (Italy), and Agrodiaetus agenjoi (Spain), which used to be considered endemic species with highly restricted distribution ranges, but were then shown to be local populations of P. ripartii.
It is very similar to Polyommatus admetus and Seitz regards it as a form of admetus - ripartii Frr. (81 f), but has on the hindwing below a white mesial streak which extends from the base to the outer margin.

Its Polish population is considered one of the most endangered butterflies in central Europe.

References

Gallery

External links
Euro Butterflies images

Polyommatus
Butterflies of Europe
Butterflies of Asia
Butterflies described in 1830